Robert Campbell Begg  (11 April 1886 – 26 July 1971) was a New Zealand medical doctor and politician. He was born in Dunedin, New Zealand, on 11 April 1886. He first studied theology and then studied medicine at the University of Edinburgh, qualifying MB ChB. After serving as a medical officer during World War I, for which he was awarded the Military Cross, he returned to Edinburgh, gaining an MD in 1923.

He was the president of the New Zealand Legion from 1933 until its demise in 1934–35, and later moved to South Africa.

In 1935, he was awarded the King George V Silver Jubilee Medal.

References

1886 births
1971 deaths
20th-century New Zealand politicians
New Zealand surgeons
People from Dunedin in health professions
New Zealand emigrants to South Africa
University of Otago alumni
Alumni of the University of Edinburgh
New Zealand hospital administrators
20th-century South African physicians
20th-century New Zealand medical doctors
New Zealand Legion politicians
Leaders of political parties in New Zealand
Wellington Hospital Board members
20th-century surgeons
South African surgeons
New Zealand recipients of the Military Cross
Politicians from Dunedin